Columbia Basin College (CBC) is a public community college in Pasco, Washington. It is accredited by the Northwest Commission on Colleges and Universities. The college offers English as a second language and General Educational Development (GED) prep classes, the Running Start program, many associate degree (transfer, associate of applied science, associate of arts) programs, and the Bachelor of Applied Science degree.

History

Columbia Basin College has served Benton and Franklin counties for nearly 60 years. The first classes at CBC were authorized by the State Board of Education in May 1955. Classes began in September, 1955 in temporary quarters at the former Pasco Naval Airbase. CBC's first permanent building was completed in 1957 and was the V building which was replaced in 2011 by the Center for Career and Technical Education (CTE). The Community College Act of 1967 separated the College from the Pasco School District and CBC became the 19th community college district in the state of Washington. CBC continually expands and renovates programs which now includes Bachelor of Applied Science degrees. The enrollment of the College has grown from 299 students in 1955 to more than 8,000 students per quarter today. The faculty includes 140 full-time instructors and 300 part-time instructors.

Campus

The Pasco campus has seen substantial growth in the past decade, adding new facilities to accommodate the large demand for higher education from a growing community. Standout facilities include the Arts Center (P building), Lee R. Thornton Center for Science, Technology, and Diversity; Bechtel National Planetarium; Robert & Elisabeth Moore Observatory; the Center for Career and Technical Education (CTE); and a research farm. Recent infrastructure improvements include substantial remodels to the Hawk Union Building (HUB), Business building, the Library, the Science building, the Administration building, the Fitness Center, the athletic fields, and the I-Complex.

The CBC Health Science Center is located in Richland, Washington, approximately 10 miles from the main campus. The four-story building was built in 2006 to house CBC's Health Sciences programs.  The Wortman Medical Science Building on the Richland Campus and a new Social Sciences and World Language building opened on the Pasco campus in 2017.

Athletics

CBC is a member of the Northwest Athletic Conference (NWAC) and the mascot is the Hawk. CBC sports include:
Volleyball
Baseball
Softball
Men's and Women's Soccer
Men's and Women's Basketball
Men's and Women's Golf

Student life

Students enjoy a variety of activities and events that are hosted by CBC, the Associated Students of CBC (ASCBC), and various student clubs. The Theatre Arts Department produces multiple stage productions each year, the Music Department has multiple concerts each quarter, and the CBC Esvelt Gallery hosts multiple student and guest artist exhibits year-round.

Notable alumni
 Byron Beck, professional basketball player
 Steve Buratto, professional football coach
 Darrell Ceciliani, professional baseball player
 Clint Didier, professional football player
 Ron East, professional football player
 Doc Hastings, politician
 Mark Kafentzis, professional football player
 Dave McKay, professional baseball player
 Chad Orvella, professional baseball player
 Leon Rice, college basketball coach
 Ray Washburn, professional baseball player

References

External links

Official website

 
Community colleges in Washington (state)
Tri-Cities, Washington
Universities and colleges accredited by the Northwest Commission on Colleges and Universities
Pasco, Washington
Two-year colleges in the United States
Buildings and structures in Franklin County, Washington
Education in Franklin County, Washington
1955 establishments in Washington (state)
Educational institutions established in 1955